Patacancha (possibly from Quechua pata step, bank of a river, kancha corral, "step corral" or "bank corral") is a  mountain in the Urubamba mountain range in the Andes of Peru. It is located in the Cusco Region, Urubamba Province, Ollantaytambo District. Patacancha lies at the Patacancha River above the village of Patacancha, northeast of Huarmaripayoc and southeast of Huacratanca.

References

Mountains of Peru
Mountains of Cusco Region